Bulwell Forest may refer to:

Bulwell Forest railway station, a former station on the Great Northern Railway in Nottingham, England
Bulwell Forest tram stop, a stop on the Nottingham Express Transit system in Nottingham, England
Bulwell Forest ward, a local authority ward in the city of Nottingham, England